Timothy Yahaya (b 1967) is an Anglican bishop in Nigeria: formerly the Bishop of Jalingo he is the current Bishop of Kaduna, one of ten dioceses within the Anglican Province of Kaduna, itself one of 14 provinces within the Church of Nigeria.

Notes

Living people
1967 births
Anglican bishops of Jalingo
Anglican bishops of Kaduna
21st-century Anglican bishops in Nigeria